Lucas Ribeiro Costa (born 9 October 1998) is a Brazilian professional footballer who plays as a midfielder for Challenger Pro League club Beveren.

Professional career
Ribeiro Costa is a youth product of Pinheiros, and then moved to France with Valenciennes. Ribeiro Costa made his professional debut with Virton in a 3-2 Belgian First Division B win over Roeselare on 27 October 2019. On 30 June 2020, Ribeiro Costa signed with Charleroi.

On  1 February 2021, Ribeiro Costa moved to Belgian First Division B club RWDM on a loan deal until the end of the season.

On 11 August 2021, he joined Mouscron on a season-long loan with an option to buy. On 19 January 2022, Mouscron loan was terminated and Ribeiro Costa was loaned to Waasland-Beveren until the end of the season. The option to buy was triggered on 6 April, and he signed a two-year contract with the club.

References

External links
 
 JPL Profile
 Sporting Charleroi Profile

1998 births
Living people
Sportspeople from Maranhão
Brazilian footballers
Valenciennes FC players
R.E. Virton players
R. Charleroi S.C. players
RWDM47 players
Royal Excel Mouscron players
S.K. Beveren players
Belgian Pro League players
Challenger Pro League players
Association football midfielders
Brazilian expatriate footballers
Brazilian expatriate sportspeople in France
Expatriate footballers in France
Brazilian expatriate sportspeople in Belgium
Expatriate footballers in Belgium